FC Sportist  is a Bulgarian football club based in Svoge, which currently competes in the Second League, the second tier of Bulgarian football, following promotion from the Third League.

The club was founded in 1924 and their home ground is the Stadion Chavdar Tsvetkov, which has a seating capacity of 3,500 spectators. The club's biggest success is promotion to the Bulgarian top division in 2009, although they were relegated at the end of the 2009-10 season. The club plays home games in blue and white kits.

History

Early Years
Sportist Svoge was formed in 1924, as a sports club characterized by a blue and white check jersey. In 1949, after reorganization, the club was renamed to DSNM Svoge. In the years between 1952 and 1954, the sports club competes with the name of Minyor Svoge, and in the period between 1954 and 1957 carries the simple name FC Svoge. The club finally became known as Sportist Svoge in 1957, the name, which is known to date.

Road to the Elite
Until 2007, Sportist participated in either the third or the fourth amateurs divisions, but in 2006-07 the team were promoted for the first time to second division. In their first season in professional football, the club finished in 6th place. In 2008 manager Aleksandar Aleksandrov laid the foundations of a good team. The 2008-09 season in the domestic league was successful for the team, which finished 2nd, and managed to participate in the play-off for promotion in the Bulgarian A PFG. On June 17, 2009, Sportist surprisingly won the play-off against Naftex Burgas with a result of 6:4 in the penalty shoot-out and qualified for the A PFG for the first time in the club's history.

A Group Season
On August 10, 2009, in the first match of the club in the top division of Bulgarian football, Sportist finished with a 1:1 draw against Slavia Sofia. The first goal for the club in the A PFG scored Georgi Semerdzhiev. The first win came in the 5th round against Lokomotiv Plovdiv, with 2:1 at the Stadion Chavdar Cvetkov. Sportist won just five games in their first A PFG campaign. From these five wins, four came from home games. They managed to beat Botev Plovdiv, Cherno More Varna, Lokomotiv Plovdiv, and Sliven. Away results weren't as impressive. Svoge only managed to beat FC Minyor Pernik and draw against Botev Plovdiv. These results earned the team 19 points, which was 13 points below the relegation line. Sportist were relegated at the end of the season to the B PFG.

Financial Difficulties and Relegations
The following two seasons were successful for the club, as they managed to earn second place twice in a row, qualifying for the promotion playoffs, but Sportist were unlucky on both occasions, losing to Chernomorets Pomorie and Botev Plovdiv respectively. For the 2013-14 B Group season, Sportist Svoge did not obtain a license due to financial reasons and was excluded from the second league. The team was relegated to the fourth tier of Bulgarian football, but managed to promote to the third tier the following season, 2013-14. After 2 seasons in the third division, Sportist was again relegated to the fourth tier. The team remained there until 2018 when they won promotion to the third league once more for the 2018-19 season. Svoge finished in 15th place following its return to the third division. 

For the 2019-20 season, Sportist finished in third place in the third tier, but earned promotion to the second level, following the disqualification of Pomorie from the second tier.

League positions

Honours 
Bulgarian A PFG:
 15th place in the "A" group: 2009/10
Bulgarian Cup:
 1/8 finalist 1950 and 2007/08

Stadium 

The club's home ground is the Chavdar Tsvetkov Stadium. It was opened in 1967.

Until 2007, the stadium was called Iskar. The same year, the stadium underwent serious renovation and its capacity was increased to 1,600 spectators and was renamed after the legendary striker of the club - Chavdar Tsvetkov. The stadium also has a parking lot with 120 parking spaces, including 10 for disabled people. 

In 2009, the stadium's capacity was expanded to 3,500 spectators. The record attendance at the stadium is 3,250 spectators and was achieved at the game between Sportist and Levski Sofia on October 25, 2009.

Current squad 
As of 28 February 2022

 

For recent transfers, see Transfers summer 2022.

Managerial history
This is a list of the last six Sportist Svoge managers:

As of 19 April 2010

References

External links 
 Official Website
 Unofficial Website

Football clubs in Bulgaria
Association football clubs established in 1924
1924 establishments in Bulgaria